The Blanco blind salamander (Eurycea robusta) is a species of aquatic, lungless salamander native to the United States. It is endemic to a small region of the Blanco River near San Marcos in Hays County, Texas. Its habitat, deep in limestone karst, makes collecting specimens for research particularly problematic. It is known from only a single specimen, collected in the 1950s.

The Blanco blind salamander is considered a lost species, as it is unknown whether it is still alive or not. Four specimens were discovered in 1951 by a gravel company digging in the dry bed of the Blanco River. Two were eaten by a heron, one was lost and the final specimen was sent to the University of Texas at Austin for research. Any extant members of the species are believed to live in the Edwards Aquifer. Researchers are using environmental DNA analysis to assess whether it still lives, but are hampered by the fact that no extant viable DNA samples exist. For that reason, they are using similar related species, such as the Texas blind salamander, as a proxy.

References 

  (2000): Phylogenetic relationships of central Texas hemidactyliine plethodontid salamanders, genus Eurycea, and a taxonomic revision of the group. Herpetological Monographs 14: 1-80.
  (2001): A new species of subterranean blind salamander (Plethodontidae: Hemidactyliini: Eurycea: Typhlomolge) from Austin, Texas, and a systematic revision of central Texas paedomorphic salamanders. Herpetologica 57: 266–280.
Amphibian Species of the World: Eurycea robusta
IUCN Red List: Eurycea robusta
Discover Life: Eurycea robusta

Robusta
Cave salamanders
Amphibians described in 1978